Erwin Rudolf Josef Alexander Schrödinger (12 August 1887 – 4 January 1961), sometimes written as  or , was a Nobel Prize-winning Austrian and naturalized Irish physicist who developed a number of fundamental results in quantum theory: the Schrödinger equation provides a way to calculate the wave function of a system and how it changes dynamically in time.

In addition, he wrote many works on various aspects of physics: statistical mechanics and thermodynamics, physics of dielectrics, colour theory, electrodynamics, general relativity, and cosmology, and he made several attempts to construct a unified field theory. In his book What Is Life? Schrödinger addressed the problems of genetics, looking at the phenomenon of life from the point of view of physics. He also paid great attention to the philosophical aspects of science, ancient, and oriental philosophical concepts, ethics, and religion. He also wrote on philosophy and theoretical biology. In popular culture, he is most known for his "Schrödinger's cat" thought experiment.

Spending most of his life as an academic with positions at various universities, Schrödinger, along with Paul Dirac, won the Nobel Prize in Physics in 1933 for his work on quantum mechanics, the same year he left Germany due to his opposition to Nazism. In his personal life, he lived with both his wife and his mistress which may have led to problems causing him to leave his position at Oxford. Subsequently, until 1938, he had a position in Graz, Austria, until the Nazi takeover when he fled, finally finding a long-term arrangement in Dublin where he remained until retirement in 1955. He died in Vienna of tuberculosis when he was 73.

Biography

Early years
He was their only child.

His mother was of half Austrian and half English descent; his father was Catholic and his mother was Lutheran. Although he was raised in a religious household as a Lutheran, he himself was an atheist. However, he had strong interests in Eastern religions and pantheism, and he used religious symbolism in his works. He also believed his scientific work was an approach to Divinity, albeit in an intellectual sense.

He was also able to learn English outside school, as his maternal grandmother was British. Between 1906 and 1910 (the year he earned his doctorate) Schrödinger studied at the University of Vienna under the physicists Franz S. Exner (1849–1926) and Friedrich Hasenöhrl (1874–1915). He received his doctorate at Vienna under Hasenöhrl. He also conducted experimental work with Karl Wilhelm Friedrich "Fritz" Kohlrausch. In 1911, Schrödinger became an assistant to Exner.

Middle years

In 1914 Schrödinger achieved habilitation (venia legendi). Between 1914 and 1918 he participated in war work as a commissioned officer in the Austrian fortress artillery (Gorizia, Duino, Sistiana, Prosecco, Vienna). In 1920 he became the assistant to Max Wien, in Jena, and in September 1920 he attained the position of ao. Prof. (ausserordentlicher Professor), roughly equivalent to Reader (UK) or associate professor (US), in Stuttgart. In 1921, he became o. Prof. (ordentlicher Professor, i.e. full professor), in Breslau (now Wrocław, Poland).

In 1921, he moved to the University of Zürich. In 1927, he succeeded Max Planck at the Friedrich Wilhelm University in Berlin. In 1933, Schrödinger decided to leave Germany because he strongly disapproved of the Nazis' antisemitism. He became a Fellow of Magdalen College at the University of Oxford. Soon after he arrived, he received the Nobel Prize together with Paul Dirac. His position at Oxford did not work out well; his unconventional domestic arrangements, sharing living quarters with two women, were not met with acceptance. In 1934, Schrödinger lectured at Princeton University; he was offered a permanent position there, but did not accept it. Again, his wish to set up house with his wife and his mistress may have created a problem. He had the prospect of a position at the University of Edinburgh but visa delays occurred, and in the end he took up a position at the University of Graz in Austria in 1936. He had also accepted the offer of chair position at Department of Physics, Allahabad University in India.

In the midst of these tenure issues in 1935, after extensive correspondence with Albert Einstein, he proposed what is now called the Schrödinger's cat thought experiment.

Later years
In 1938, after the Anschluss, Schrödinger had problems in Graz because of his flight from Germany in 1933 and his known opposition to Nazism. He issued a statement recanting this opposition (he later regretted doing so and explained the reason to Einstein). However, this did not fully appease the new dispensation and the University of Graz dismissed him from his post for political unreliability. He suffered harassment and was instructed not to leave the country. He and his wife, however, fled to Italy. From there, he went to visiting positions in Oxford and Ghent University.

In the same year he received a personal invitation from Ireland's Taoiseach, Éamon de Valera – a mathematician himself – to reside in Ireland and agree to help establish an Institute for Advanced Studies in Dublin. He moved to Kincora Road, Clontarf, Dublin, and lived modestly. A plaque has been erected at his Clontarf residence and at the address of his workplace in Merrion Square. Schrodinger believed that as an Austrian he had a unique relationship to Ireland. In October 1940, a writer from the Irish Press interviewed Schrodinger who spoke of Celtic heritage of Austrians, saying: "I believe there is a deeper connection between us Austrians and the Celts. Names of places in the Austrian Alps are said to be of Celtic origin." He became the Director of the School for Theoretical Physics in 1940 and remained there for 17 years. He became a naturalized Irish citizen in 1948, but also retained his Austrian citizenship. He wrote around 50 further publications on various topics, including his explorations of unified field theory.

In 1944, he wrote What Is Life?, which contains a discussion of negentropy and the concept of a complex molecule with the genetic code for living organisms. According to James D. Watson's memoir, DNA, the Secret of Life, Schrödinger's book gave Watson the inspiration to research the gene, which led to the discovery of the DNA double helix structure in 1953. Similarly, Francis Crick, in his autobiographical book What Mad Pursuit, described how he was influenced by Schrödinger's speculations about how genetic information might be stored in molecules.

Schrödinger stayed in Dublin until retiring in 1955.

A manuscript "Fragment from an unpublished dialogue of Galileo" from this time recently resurfaced at The King's Hospital boarding school, Dublin after it was written for the School's 1955 edition of their Blue Coat to celebrate his leaving of Dublin to take up his appointment as Chair of Physics at the University of Vienna.

In 1956, he returned to Vienna (chair ad personam). At an important lecture during the World Energy Conference he refused to speak on nuclear energy because of his scepticism about it and gave a philosophical lecture instead. During this period Schrödinger turned from mainstream quantum mechanics' definition of wave–particle duality and promoted the wave idea alone, causing much controversy.

Tuberculosis and death

Schrödinger suffered from tuberculosis and several times in the 1920s stayed at a sanatorium in Arosa. It was there that he formulated his wave equation. On 4 January 1961, Schrödinger died of tuberculosis, aged 73, in Vienna. He left Anny a widow, and was buried in Alpbach, Austria, in a Catholic cemetery. Although he was not Catholic, the priest in charge of the cemetery permitted the burial after learning Schrödinger was a member of the Pontifical Academy of Sciences.

Personal life
On 6 April 1920, Schrödinger married Annemarie (Anny) Bertel.

When he migrated to Ireland in 1938, he obtained visas for himself, his wife and also another woman, Hilde March. March was the wife of an Austrian colleague and Schrödinger had fathered a daughter with her in 1934. Schrödinger wrote to the Taoiseach, Éamon de Valera personally, so as to obtain a visa for March. In October 1939 the ménage à trois duly took up residence in Dublin. His wife, Anny (born 3 December 1896), died on 3 October 1965.

One of Schrödinger's grandchildren, Terry Rudolph, has followed in his footsteps as a quantum physicist, and teaches at Imperial College London.

Accusations of sexual abuse 

Schrödinger kept a record of his sexual liaisons including children he may have sexually abused in a diary he called Ephemeridae, in which he stated a "predilection for teenage girls on the grounds that their innocence was the ideal match for his natural genius".

At the age of 39, Schrödinger tutored 14-year-old "Ithi" Junger. As John Gribbin recounted in his 2012 biography of Schrödinger, "As well as the maths, the lessons included 'a fair amount of petting and cuddling' and Schrödinger soon convinced himself that he was in love with Ithi". Schrödinger assured Junger she wouldn't become pregnant, and seduced her at 17. She later became pregnant and had an abortion that left her sterile. Schrödinger left her soon after and moved on to other targets. Kate Nolan, a pseudonym used by surviving family to protect the victim, was also impregnated by Schrödinger amid claims of a lack of consent.

Carlo Rovelli notes in his book Helgoland that Schrödinger "always kept a number of relationships going at once – and made no secret of his fascination with preadolescent girls." In Ireland, Rovelli writes, he had one child each from two students identified in a Der Standard article as being a 26-year-old and a five-year-married political activist. While carrying out research into a family tree, Bernard Biggar uncovered reports of Schrödinger grooming his cousin, Barbara MacEntee, when she was 12 years old. Apparently, her uncle, the mathematician and priest Pádraig de Brún, advised Schrödinger to no longer pursue her, and Schrödinger later wrote in his journal that she was one of his "unrequited loves". MacEntee died in 1995, with the accounts emerging posthumously.

Walter Moore's biography of the scientist outlined that Schrödinger's attitude towards the women was "essentially that of a male supremacist", an assessment corroborated by Helge Kragh in his review of Moore's biography, "The conquest of women, especially very young women, was the salt of life for this sincere romantic and male chauvinist." Walter Moore used Schrödinger's relationships with girls to characterise what Moore called Schrödinger's "Lolita Complex". Schrödinger's grandson and his mother were unhappy with the accusation made by Moore, and once the biography was published, their family broke off contact with him.

In a 2021 Irish Times article, Schrödinger's pattern of serial abuse was identified by the paper as a "behaviour [that] fitted the profile of a paedophile in the widely understood sense of that term." The physics department of Trinity College Dublin announced in January 2022 that they would recommend a lecture theatre that had been named for Schrödinger since the 1990s be renamed in light of his history of sexual abuse, while a picture of the scientist would be removed, and the renaming of an eponymous lecture series would be considered.

Academic interests and life of the mind

Early in his life, Schrödinger experimented in the fields of electrical engineering, atmospheric electricity, and atmospheric radioactivity, but he usually worked with his former teacher Franz Exner. He also studied vibrational theory, the theory of Brownian motion, and mathematical statistics. In 1912, at the request of the editors of the Handbook of Electricity and Magnetism, Schrödinger wrote an article titled Dielectrism. That same year, Schrödinger gave a theoretical estimate of the probable height distribution of radioactive substances, which is required to explain the observed radioactivity of the atmosphere, and in August 1913 executed several experiments in Zeehame that confirmed his theoretical estimate and those of Victor Franz Hess. For this work, Schrödinger was awarded the 1920 Haitinger Prize (Haitinger-Preis) of the Austrian Academy of Sciences. Other experimental studies conducted by the young researcher in 1914 were checking formulas for capillary pressure in gas bubbles and the study of the properties of soft beta radiation produced by gamma rays striking metal surface. The last work he performed together with his friend Fritz Kohlrausch. In 1919, Schrödinger performed his last physical experiment on coherent light and subsequently focused on theoretical studies.

Quantum mechanics

New quantum theory
In the first years of his career Schrödinger became acquainted with the ideas of the old quantum theory, developed in the works of Max Planck, Albert Einstein, Niels Bohr, Arnold Sommerfeld, and others. This knowledge helped him work on some problems in theoretical physics, but the Austrian scientist at the time was not yet ready to part with the traditional methods of classical physics.

The first publications of Schrödinger about atomic theory and the theory of spectra began to emerge only from the beginning of the 1920s, after his personal acquaintance with Sommerfeld and Wolfgang Pauli and his move to Germany. In January 1921, Schrödinger finished his first article on this subject, about the framework of the Bohr-Sommerfeld effect of the interaction of electrons on some features of the spectra of the alkali metals. Of particular interest to him was the introduction of relativistic considerations in quantum theory. In autumn 1922 he analyzed the electron orbits in an atom from a geometric point of view, using methods developed by the mathematician Hermann Weyl (1885–1955). This work, in which it was shown that quantum orbits are associated with certain geometric properties, was an important step in predicting some of the features of wave mechanics. Earlier in the same year he created the Schrödinger equation of the relativistic Doppler effect for spectral lines, based on the hypothesis of light quanta and considerations of energy and momentum. He liked the idea of his teacher Exner on the statistical nature of the conservation laws, so he enthusiastically embraced the articles of Bohr, Kramers, and Slater, which suggested the possibility of violation of these laws in individual atomic processes (for example, in the process of emission of radiation). Although the experiments of Hans Geiger and Walther Bothe soon cast doubt on this, the idea of energy as a statistical concept was a lifelong attraction for Schrödinger and he discussed it in some reports and publications.

Creation of wave mechanics
In January 1926, Schrödinger published in Annalen der Physik the paper "" (Quantization as an Eigenvalue Problem) on wave mechanics and presented what is now known as the Schrödinger equation. In this paper, he gave a "derivation" of the wave equation for time-independent systems and showed that it gave the correct energy eigenvalues for a hydrogen-like atom. This paper has been universally celebrated as one of the most important achievements of the twentieth century and created a revolution in most areas of quantum mechanics and indeed of all physics and chemistry. A second paper was submitted just four weeks later that solved the quantum harmonic oscillator, rigid rotor, and diatomic molecule problems and gave a new derivation of the Schrödinger equation. A third paper, published in May, showed the equivalence of his approach to that of Heisenberg and gave the treatment of the Stark effect. A fourth paper in this series showed how to treat problems in which the system changes with time, as in scattering problems. In this paper he introduced a complex solution to the wave equation in order to prevent the occurrence of fourth and sixth order differential equations. Schrödinger ultimately reduced the order of the equation to one. (This was arguably the moment when quantum mechanics switched from real to complex numbers.) These papers were his central achievement and were at once recognized as having great significance by the physics community.

Schrödinger was not entirely comfortable with the implications of quantum theory referring to his theory as "wave mechanics." He wrote about the probability interpretation of quantum mechanics, saying, "I don't like it, and I'm sorry I ever had anything to do with it." (Just in order to ridicule the Copenhagen interpretation of quantum mechanics, he contrived the famous thought experiment called Schrödinger's cat paradox, and was said to have angrily complained to his students that "now the damned Gottingen physicists use my beautiful wave mechanics for calculating their shitty matrix elements")

Work on a unified field theory
Following his work on quantum mechanics, Schrödinger devoted considerable effort to working on a unified field theory that would unite gravity, electromagnetism, and nuclear forces within the basic framework of General Relativity, doing the work with an extended correspondence with Albert Einstein. In 1947, he announced a result, "Affine Field Theory," in a talk at the Royal Irish Academy, but the announcement was criticized by Einstein as "preliminary" and failed to lead to the desired unified theory. Following the failure of his attempt at unification, Schrödinger gave up his work on unification and turned to other topics.

Color
Schrödinger had a strong interest in psychology, in particular color perception and colorimetry. He spent quite a few years of his life working on these questions and published a series of papers in this area:
 "Theorie der Pigmente von größter Leuchtkraft", Annalen der Physik, (4), 62, (1920), 603–22 (Theory of Pigments with Highest Luminosity)
 "Grundlinien einer Theorie der Farbenmetrik im Tagessehen", Annalen der Physik, (4), 63, (1920), 397–456; 481–520 (Outline of a theory of colour measurement for daylight vision)
 "Farbenmetrik", Zeitschrift für Physik, 1, (1920), 459–66 (Colour measurement).
 "Über das Verhältnis der Vierfarben- zur Dreifarben-theorie", Mathematisch-Naturwissenschaftliche Klasse, Akademie der Wissenschaften, Wien, 134, 471, (On The Relationship of Four-Color Theory to Three-Color Theory).
 "Lehre von der strahlenden Energie", Müller-Pouillets Lehrbuch der Physik und Meteorologie, Vol 2, Part 1 (1926) (Thresholds of Color Differences).

His work on the psychology of color perception follows the step of Newton, Maxwell and von Helmholtz in the same area. Some of these papers have been translated into English and can be found in: Sources of Colour Science, Ed. David L. MacAdam, MIT Press (1970) and in Erwin Schrödinger’s Color Theory, Translated with Modern Commentary, Ed. Keith K. Niall, Springer (2017).  .

Interest in philosophy 
Schrödinger had a deep interest in philosophy, and was influenced by the works of Arthur Schopenhauer and Baruch Spinoza. In his 1956 lecture "Mind and Matter", he said that "The world extended in space and time is but our representation." This is a repetition of the first words of Schopenhauer's main work. Schopenhauer's works also introduced him to Indian philosophy, more specifically to the Upanishads and Advaita Vedanta’s interpretation. He once took on a particular line of thought: "If the world is indeed created by our act of observation, there should be billions of such worlds, one for each of us. How come your world and my world are the same? If something happens in my world, does it happen in your world, too? What causes all these worlds to synchronize with each other?".

"There is obviously only one alternative, namely the unification of minds or consciousnesses. Their multiplicity is only apparent, in truth there is only one mind. This is the doctrine of the Upanishads."Schrödinger discussed topics such as consciousness, the mind-body problem, sense perception, free will, and objective reality in his lectures and writings.

Schrödinger’s attitude with respect to the relations between Eastern and Western thought was one of prudence, expressing appreciation for Eastern philosophy while also admitting that some of the ideas did not fit with empirical approaches to natural philosophy. Some commentators have suggested that Schrödinger was so deeply immersed in a non-dualist Vedântic-like view that it may have served as a broad framework or subliminal inspiration for much of his work including that in theoretical physics. Schrödinger expressed sympathy for the idea of tat tvam asi, stating "you can throw yourself flat on the ground, stretched out upon Mother Earth, with the certain conviction that you are one with her and she with you."

Schrödinger said that "Consciousness cannot be accounted for in physical terms. For consciousness is absolutely fundamental. It cannot be accounted for in terms of anything else."

Legacy
The philosophical issues raised by Schrödinger's cat are still debated today and remain his most enduring legacy in popular science, while Schrödinger's equation is his most enduring legacy at a more technical level. Schrödinger is one of several individuals who have been called "the father of quantum mechanics". The large crater Schrödinger, on the far side of the Moon, is named after him. The Erwin Schrödinger International Institute for Mathematical Physics was established in Vienna in 1993.

Schrödinger's portrait was the main feature of the design of the 1983–97 Austrian 1000-schilling banknote, the second-highest denomination.

A building is named after him at the University of Limerick, in Limerick, Ireland, as is the 'Erwin Schrödinger Zentrum' at Adlershof in Berlin.

Schrödinger also has a lecture hall in Trinity College Dublin dedicated to him. In January 2022, the head of the school of physics stated there would be a recommendation to drop Schrödinger lecture theatre name due to Schrödinger's "history of sexually abusing women and children".

Schrödinger's 126th birthday anniversary in 2013 was celebrated with a Google Doodle.

Honors and awards

 Nobel Prize in Physics (1933) for the formulation of the Schrödinger equation, shared with Paul Dirac
 Max Planck Medal (1937)
 Elected a Foreign Member of the Royal Society (ForMemRS) in 1949
 Erwin Schrödinger Prize of the Austrian Academy of Sciences (1956)
 Austrian Decoration for Science and Art (1957)

Schrödinger's cat is named in his honour, see also: List of things named after Erwin Schrödinger.

Published works
 The List of Erwin Schrödinger's publications , compiled by Auguste Dick, Gabriele Kerber, Wolfgang Kerber and Karl von Meyenn
 Science and the human temperament Allen & Unwin (1935), translated and introduced by James Murphy, with a foreword by Ernest Rutherford
 Nature and the Greeks and Science and Humanism Cambridge University Press (1996) .
 The interpretation of Quantum Mechanics Ox Bow Press (1995) .
 Statistical Thermodynamics Dover Publications (1989) .
 Collected papers Friedr. Vieweg & Sohn (1984) .
 My View of the World Ox Bow Press (1983) .
 Expanding Universes Cambridge University Press (1956).
 Space-Time Structure Cambridge University Press (1950) .
 What Is Life? Macmillan (1944).
 What Is Life? & Mind and Matter Cambridge University Press (1974) .

References

Sources

External links

 Erwin Schrödinger and others on Austrian banknotes
 
 "biographie" (in German) or
 "Biography from the Austrian Central Library for Physics" (in English)
 Encyclopædia Britannica article on Erwin Schrödinger
  with his Nobel Lecture, 12 December 1933 The Fundamental Idea of Wave Mechanics
 Vallabhan, C. P. Girija, "Indian influences on Quantum Dynamics" [ed. Schrödinger's interest in Vedanta]
 Schrödinger Medal of the World Association of Theoretically Oriented Chemists (WATOC)
 The Discovery of New Productive Forms of Atomic Theory Nobel Banquet speech (in German)
 Annotated bibliography for Erwin Schrödinger from the Alsos Digital Library for Nuclear Issues
  Critical interdisciplinary review of Schrödinger's "What Is life?"
 
 Schrödinger in Oxford by Sir David C Clary  , World Scientific, 2022

 
Academics of the Dublin Institute for Advanced Studies
Austrian atheists
Austrian emigrants to Ireland
Austrian Nobel laureates
Austrian people of English descent
Austro-Hungarian Nobel laureates
Austrian people of British descent
Austro-Hungarian military personnel of World War I
Corresponding Members of the USSR Academy of Sciences
Emigrants from Austria after the Anschluss
Fellows of Magdalen College, Oxford
Fellows of the American Physical Society
Foreign Members of the Royal Society
Honorary Members of the USSR Academy of Sciences
Academic staff of the Humboldt University of Berlin
Irish physicists
Mathematical physicists
Members of the German Academy of Sciences at Berlin
Members of the Pontifical Academy of Sciences
Members of the Royal Irish Academy
20th-century mystics
Nobel laureates in Physics
Optical physicists
People associated with the University of Zurich
People from Clontarf, Dublin
People from Landstraße
Philosophers of science
Quantum physicists
Recipients of the Austrian Decoration for Science and Art
Recipients of the Matteucci Medal
Recipients of the Pour le Mérite (civil class)
Theoretical physicists
Thermodynamicists
Tuberculosis deaths in Austria
Academic staff of the University of Breslau
Academic staff of the University of Graz
Academic staff of the University of Stuttgart
Academic staff of the University of Vienna
Winners of the Max Planck Medal
1887 births
1961 deaths
20th-century atheists
20th-century Austrian mathematicians
20th-century Austrian physicists
20th-century deaths from tuberculosis